Sandve is a village in Karmøy municipality in Rogaland county, Norway.  The village is located on the southwestern part of the island of Karmøy, north of the town of Skudeneshavn, and it faces the Atlantic Ocean to the west. 

During World War II, the Wehrmacht bombed this village because of connections to the Allied forces.

References

Villages in Rogaland
Karmøy